Benjamin F. Keys (November 22, 1853 – June 7, 1911) was an American archer. He competed in the men's double York round, men's double American round, and the men's team round at the 1904 Summer Olympics.

References

External links
 

1853 births
1911 deaths
Olympic archers of the United States
American male archers
Archers at the 1904 Summer Olympics
Sportspeople from Cincinnati